The 1949 South Dakota State Jackrabbits football team was an American football team that represented South Dakota State University in the North Central Conference (NCC) during the 1949 college football season. In its third season under head coach Ralph Ginn, the team compiled a 7–3 record, tied for the NCC championship, and outscored opponents by a total of 183 to 175.

Schedule

References

South Dakota State
South Dakota State Jackrabbits football seasons
North Central Conference football champion seasons
South Dakota State Jackrabbits football